The Magistrates Court of Queensland is the lowest court in the court hierarchy of Queensland, Australia.  All criminal proceedings in Queensland begin in the Magistrates Court, with minor offences being dealt with summarily, and more serious ones being referred to a higher court on the strength of evidence. Most criminal cases are first heard in the Magistrates Court, as are most civil cases. The Magistrates Court hears approximately 95% of all court cases in Queensland.

Decisions made by the Magistrates Court may be heard on appeal to the District Court of Queensland. The Magistrates Court does not have an appellate jurisdiction.

The Chief Magistrate of Queensland, since 2019, is Judge Terry Gardiner.

Jurisdiction

Civil
The Magistrates Court has the jurisdiction to decide on civil matters for which the amount in dispute is less than or equal to 150,000.  Civil matters in which the amount in dispute is more than $150,000 are decided by either the District Court or the Supreme Court.

Criminal
The Magistrates Court has the jurisdiction to decide on charges of summary offences, and indictable offence which may be heard summarily. 

The Magistrates Court also conducts committal hearings in which the presiding magistrate decides, based on the strength of the evidence, whether to refer the matter to a higher court.

Procedure
Those present at court typically include the magistrate, police prosecutor, defendant, plaintiff and witnesses for either party. It is a condition that those who enter the court bow to the Queensland Coat of Arms, situated behind the Bench, upon entry. Plaintiffs, defendants, their counsel and witnesses must rise when they wish to address the bench or when addressed by the magistrate. 

Members of the media and general public are allowed into the courtroom, except where a party to the proceedings is under 18 in which case the court becomes a child court and the media and public will only have restricted access to the court.

Notable former magistrates
 Di Fingleton
 Basil Gribbin

See also

 Australian court hierarchy
 Judiciary of Australia
 List of Queensland courts and tribunals

References

Attribution 
  This Wikipedia article incorporates text from About Magistrates Courts published by the State of Queensland under CC-BY 3.0 AU licence (accessed on 4 August 2016).

External links 
 

Queensland courts and tribunals
Articles incorporating text from the Queensland Government